"Knife" is a song by Brooklyn-based indie rock band Grizzly Bear, from the band's second studio album,Yellow House. The song was released as the first single on May 21, 2007.

Music video
The video for "Knife"  was directed by Isaiah Saxon and Sean Hellfritsch of Encyclopedia Pictura. It features the band members in the desert sun operating a machine, a bearded person and a creepy creature made of dust and rocks.

Daniel Rossen explained about the music video:

Track listing

Reception
"Knife" was ranked #109 on Pitchfork Media's list of the top 500 tracks of the 2000s. Describing the song, reviewer Brian Howe wrote: "There are just a few words, inscribed in a lavish script on the harmonies; a handful of chords. But a whole host of sensations pour through them, and not just emotional ones: The guitars prickle and clutch; the refrains scale ear-popping altitudes. You can, it turns out, feel the knife."

References

External links
 Single synopsis at Warp Records
 

2007 singles
Grizzly Bear (band) songs
2006 songs
Warp (record label) singles